Bertil Larsson (born 8 March 1954) is a sailor from Uppsala, Sweden, who represented his country at the 1980 Summer Olympics in Tallinn as crew member in the Soling. With helmsman Jan Andersson and fellow crew member Göran Andersson they took the 8th place.

References

Living people
1954 births
Sailors at the 1980 Summer Olympics – Soling
Olympic sailors of Sweden
Sportspeople from Uppsala
Swedish male sailors (sport)
20th-century Swedish people